Chanie  is a village in the administrative district of Gmina Nurzec-Stacja, within Siemiatycze County, Podlaskie Voivodeship, in north-eastern Poland, close to the border with Belarus.

According to the 1921 census, the village was inhabited by 818 people, among whom 2 were Roman Catholic, 726 Orthodox, and 7 Mosaic. At the same time, 4 inhabitants declared Polish nationality, 77 Belarusian. There were 17 residential buildings in the village.

References

Chanie